Larry Richard Barnes, Jr. (born July 23, 1974 in Bakersfield, California) is an American former professional baseball first baseman. He attended Bakersfield High School and then Fresno State University.

Career
He was drafted by the Florida Marlins in the 1993 Major League Baseball draft, but opted not to sign. In the 1994 Major League Baseball draft, Barnes was drafted by the Atlanta Braves in the 51st round. Again, he decided it was best for him not to sign. In , he was not even in the draft-he was finally signed as a free agent by the California Angels.

Not only did Barnes-who is 6'1" and 195 pounds-have a good professional rookie season batting-wise, he also did well when it came to pitching. He hit .310 and had 12 stolen bases in 56 games—and also pitched in three games, won two, and had a 2.25 ERA.

Even though he had success pitching in his first pro year, he found minimal success in the years following.

His statistics for that season:

(Source: The Baseball Cube)
After that season, his success simmered off. But, he still performed well enough to earn a promotion. On April 11, at 26 years old, he made his major league debut with the Angels. His first glimpse of the major leagues  as he hit .100 in 40 at-bats. Perhaps one of the shining moments of his season was one of his four hits was a home run.

Barnes has only made one appearance in the majors since his 40 at-bat season with the Angels. In , with the Dodgers, he appeared in 30 games and hit .211.

In , Barnes  played for the  Las Vegas 51s in the Dodgers system, but he was released in August.

Barnes currently resides in Bakersfield, California.

External links

1974 births
Living people
Albuquerque Isotopes players
American expatriate baseball players in Canada
American expatriate baseball players in Japan
Anaheim Angels players
Arizona League Angels players
Bakersfield Renegades baseball players
Baseball players from Bakersfield, California
Cedar Rapids Kernels players
Edmonton Trappers players
Erie SeaWolves players
Fresno State Bulldogs baseball players
Gulf Coast Marlins players
Lake Elsinore Storm players
Las Vegas 51s players
Los Angeles Dodgers players
Major League Baseball first basemen
Midland Angels players
Osaka Kintetsu Buffaloes players
Salt Lake Stingers players
Somerset Patriots players